Mohammad Bilal (born 8 April 1975) is a Pakistani first-class cricketer who played for Abbottabad cricket team.

References

External links
 

1975 births
Living people
Pakistani cricketers
Abbottabad cricketers
Defence Housing Authority cricketers
People from Lakki Marwat District
Peshawar cricketers